Suzan & Freek is a Dutch singing duo from the Achterhoek, Netherlands consisting of Suzan Stortelder and Freek Rikkerink. The two live together in Weesp.

The couple had been making covers for several years and posted them on a weekly basis under the title "De Minuut" on their Facebook page. Their 2016 cover of The Chainsmokers' "Don't Let Me Down" went viral after The Chainsmokers shared the version. In September 2017, the duo released their first EP, entitled Glass House Sessions, with five covers on it. In November 2018, the duo released their very first own self-written song "Als het avond is" (meaning When it's Evening). The single topped the Dutch Top 40 and was certified platinum. It was followed up by "Blauwe dag" (meaning Blue Day)  that  reached the number 4 position. On September 27, 2019, their first album entitled Gedeeld door ons (meaning Shared by Us) was released in both the Netherlands and Belgium and entered in both countries the charts in the number 2 position.

Members
Suzan Stortelder (born in Zieuwent in 1992) – vocals and piano
Freek Rikkerink (born in Harreveld in 1993) – vocals and guitar

Discography

Albums

EPs

Singles

References

External links
Official website

Dutch musical duos
Dutch pop music groups
Male–female musical duos
Pop music duos